The Seocho Garak Tower East is a remarkable skyscraper located in Seoul, South Korea. The building was designed by ArchitectenConsort. (Later renamed to Convexarchitecten.)

References

Buildings and structures in Seocho District
Office buildings completed in 2011
Skyscraper office buildings in Seoul
2011 establishments in South Korea